The 122 mm howitzer M1938 (M-30) (GRAU index: 52-G-463) was a Soviet 121.92 mm (4.8 inch) howitzer. The weapon was developed by the design bureau of Motovilikha Plants, headed by F. F. Petrov, in the late 1930s, and was in production from 1939 to 1955. The M-30 saw action in World War II, mainly as a divisional artillery piece of the Red Army (RKKA). Captured guns were also employed later in the conflict by the German Wehrmacht and the Finnish Army. Post World War II the M-30 saw combat in numerous conflicts of the mid- to late twentieth century in service of other countries' armies, notably in the Middle East.

Development
In 1930 Red Army (RKKA) authorities started to look for a new divisional-level howitzer to replace the pre-World War I 122 mm howitzer M1909 and 122 mm howitzer M1910. Although both pieces were eventually modernized, resulting in the 122-mm howitzer M1909/37 and the 122-mm howitzer M1910/30 respectively, these upgrades did not address some shortcomings in the original designs.

The first attempt to develop a new howitzer was made by the KB-2 design bureau under the supervision of German engineers. The design, known as Lubok, reached trials in 1932 and in 1934 was adopted as the 122-mm howitzer model 1934. It had a 23 caliber barrel, a maximum elevation of 50°, traverse of 7°, and a combat and travelling weight of 2,250 and 2,800 kg respectively. Like its predecessors, Lubok had a fixed trail carriage and although it was equipped with suspension, its wheels lacked tires, limiting towing speed to only 10 km/h. Nevertheless, it was undoubtfully superior to the M1910/30 which remained in production until 1941. However, after eight pieces were built in 1934–1935, production was stopped for unclear reasons, possibly relating to the disbanding of KB-2.

In the mid-1930s, the Main Artillery Directorate (GAU) considered a switch to 105 mm guns as used by some other armies. A smaller shell meant that the gun could be lighter and consequently more mobile. On the other hand, a 105 mm gun would also be less powerful. Moreover, there was no Russian or Soviet experience with 105 mm ammunition, while for the 122 mm the country already possessed both production lines and large numbers of already manufactured shells (however similar 107 mm manufacturing equipment and ammunition—for the 107-mm gun M1910—was available). Finally in 1937 the RKKA Head of General Staff I. I. Egorov supported retaining 122 mm ammunition.

Consequently, three howitzers were trialled in 1938–1939. The design bureau of UZTM (Ural Heavy Machinery Plant, Russian: Уральский Завод Тяжёлого Машиностроения, УЗТМ), which was ordered by GAU to design the new howitzer, developed a piece designated U-2. Similar projects were privately undertaken by the design bureaus of Motovilikha Plants, headed by F. F. Petrov (M-30), and by the No. 92 plant under V. G. Grabin (F-25).

The U-2 (barrel length 21 calibers, chamber volume 3.0 litres, horizontal sliding breechblock from Lubok, muzzle brake, combat weight 2,030 kg) reached trials on 5 February 1939 and was rejected because of insufficient carriage strength and inferior ballistics. The F-25 project (barrel length 23 calibers, chamber volume 3.7 litres, horizontal sliding breechblock from Lubok, muzzle brake, combat weight 1,830 kg) was closed by GAU on 23 March 1939 as GAU considered it redundant to the M-30 which had reached trials earlier. The latter, after being returned several times for revision, was finally adopted in September 1939 as the 122 mm divisional howitzer M1938. Its GAU index number was 52-G-463.

M-30 versus F-25
A. B. Shirokorad, a well-known author of books detailing the history of the Soviet artillery, has claimed that the F-25 could have been developed into a better gun than the M-30. Grabin's design was about 400 kg lighter, had a greater traverse and had better ground clearance – all this was achieved, according to Shirokorad, without sacrificing ballistics (same barrel length, chamber volume and muzzle length). Considering how long it took to finish the development of the M-30, the F-25's schedule possibly did not significantly lag behind.

There is no official document explaining the advantages the M-30 had over the F-25. Factors that could have influenced the GAU decision were:
 Unlike the F-25, the M-30 was not equipped with a muzzle brake. While softening recoil and thus allowing for a lighter carriage, the muzzle brake has a disadvantage of redirecting some of the gases that escape the barrel toward the ground where they raise dust, revealing the gun's position. Another side-effect of a muzzle brake is the increased muzzle blast behind the gun, adversely affecting the working conditions of its crew.
 The M-30 used many elements from existing guns, most notably the interrupted-screw breechblock of the M1910/30. Since at that time Soviet industry had experienced major difficulties with manufacturing sliding breechblocks (as used by the F-25) for large caliber guns, the lowered technical risk can be considered a significant advantage.
 The stronger carriage of the M-30 could be used – and in fact was used – for more powerful artillery pieces (see 152-mm howitzer M1943 (D-1)).

Production
Mass production of M-30 howitzers began in 1940 at Plant No. 92 in Gorky and No. 9 in Sverdlovsk. The former took part in the production of M-30s only in 1940, building a total of 500 pieces. In addition to towed howitzers, Plant No. 9 produced M-30S barrels for arming SU-122 assault guns. Some 700 barrels (including both serial-production and experimental articles) were manufactured for this purpose. Mass production continued into 1955. In 1950–1960, the M-30 was also produced by Huta Stalowa Wola in Poland where it was known as Wz.1938.

Description

The barrel of the M-30 was of built-up construction and consisted of a liner, jacket and breech. The breechblock was of interrupted screw type, with forced cartridge case extraction. The gun was equipped with a hydraulic recoil buffer and hydropneumatic recuperator. A panoramic sight was used for both indirect and direct fire.

The M-30 had a modern split trail carriage with leaf spring suspension and steel wheels with rubber tires. It was usually towed by vehicle without a limber. The carriage allowed for a towing speed of up to 50 km/h on paved road and up to 35 km/h on gravel or dirt roads, although the gun could also be moved by a team of six horses, in which case a limber was used. When the trails were swung open the suspension locked automatically . In an emergency it was possible to shoot in a "single trail" mode, at the price of a drastically reduced traverse (1°30'). The time required to set the gun up for combat was about 1–1.5 minutes.

The carriage of the M-30 was later used for the D-1 152 mm howitzer.

Organization and employment

Red Army 
The M-30 was a divisional level howitzer.  According to the organization of 1939, each rifle division had two artillery regiments; one light regiment (a battalion of 76 mm guns; two mixed battalions with one battery of 76 mm guns and two batteries of 122 mm howitzers) and one howitzer regiment (a battalion of 122 mm howitzers and a battalion of 152 mm howitzers), giving 28 122 mm howitzers per division. In June 1940 one more battalion of 122 mm howitzers was added to the howitzer regiment, bringing the number of guns in each unit to 32.  In June 1941 the howitzer regiment was removed and the number of howitzers dropped to 16.  This organization was used throughout the war, except in Russian Guards rifle divisions which from December 1942 had three artillery battalions (two batteries of 76 mm guns and one battery of 122 mm howitzers each), totaling 12 howitzers. From December 1944 they received an extra howitzer regiment (5 batteries, 20 howitzers) and from June 1945 rifle divisions were reorganized identically.

Mountain rifle divisions in 1939–1940 had one battalion of 122 mm howitzers (3 batteries, 9 guns).  From 1941 they received instead one artillery regiment (2 battalions, each from 3 four-gun batteries) with 24 howitzers, but in early 1942 only one battalion (2 batteries, 8 howitzers) remained. From 1944 howitzers were removed from mountain rifle divisions.

Motorized divisions had two mixed battalions (a battery of 76 mm guns and two batteries of 122 mm howitzers), totaling 12 howitzers.  Tank divisions had one battalion with 12 howitzers.  Cavalry divisions until August 1941 had two batteries of 122 mm howitzers, totaling eight, before the divisional artillery was removed.

Until late 1941 rifle brigades had a battery of four 122 mm howitzers. 122 mm howitzers were also used by the howitzer brigades of the Reserve of the Main Command (72–84 pieces).

By 1 June 1941 1,667 M-30s were in service, comprising only a fraction of the RKKA divisional howitzers. As the war progressed, their share grew rapidly due to mass production and because many older guns were lost in combat in 1941–42.

M-30 howitzers were primarily employed for indirect fire against enemy personnel. They were also used against field fortifications, for clearing minefields and for breaching barbed wire. Their HE-fragmentation shells presented a danger to armoured vehicles. Fragments created by the explosion could penetrate up to 20 mm of armour, – enough against thinly armoured vehicles. The shells could also damage chassis, sights or other elements of heavier armoured vehicles.

For self-defense against enemy tanks a HEAT shell was developed in 1943. Before 1943, crews were required to rely on the high-explosive action of their regular ammunition, with some degree of success. According to a German report from 1943, even a Tiger was once heavily damaged by SU-122 assault guns firing high-explosive shells.

M-30 howitzers were towed by a variety of means, from horses, oxen and both Soviet and American-produced Lend-Lease trucks (such as the Dodge WC series and Studebaker US6s) and STZ-5 and Ya-12 purpose-built artillery tractors. When necessary, the gun could be manhandled by its artillery crew.

In 1944, the Artillery Regiment of a typical Russian Rifle Division was armed with 36 122mm Howitzers, along with 72 76.2mm ZiS-3 field guns.

The gun was eventually replaced by the 122-mm howitzer D-30 after the latter was adopted for service in 1960. A small number of operational M-30 howitzers are still present in Russian Army ordnance depots. They are being gradually withdrawn from reserve. M-30s featured in many Soviet movies used for novice artillery crew training. These movies were made in the 1960s when more modern D-30 howitzers were becoming available, however the M-30 was considered by authorities as much more suitable for training purposes. The movies are still in use despite the absence of M-30 howitzers even in practice exercises.

Other operators
A number of M-30s fell into the hands of the Wehrmacht in 1941–1942 and were adopted as 12,2 cm s.F.H.396(r) heavy howitzers. Germany began mass production of 122 mm ammunition for these and other captured howitzers, producing 424,000 shells in 1943, 696,700 in 1944 and 133,000 in 1945. Some captured M-30s were used in the Atlantic Wall fortifications.

The Finnish Army captured 41 guns of the type and adopted them as the 122 H 38. These guns fired 13,298 shells in combat; only a few pieces were lost. The gun was well liked; some were used for training or stored in depots until the mid-1980s.

The Kingdom of Romania captured in 1941 a number of 477 various types of 122 mm howitzers and guns including M1931/37 and were used as divisional artillery for units rebuilt in 1943. The M-30 was used on the first four prototypes of the Mareșal tank destroyer, having a muzzle brake attached to it by the Romanians.

After World War II the gun was supplied to many countries around the globe. With the Egyptian and Syrian armies it saw action in the Arab-Israeli Wars. Some of these guns were captured by Israel, although it is unclear whether they were ever employed by the Israeli Defense Forces. The People's Republic of China organized their own production of M-30 howitzers under the Type 54 designation.

According to Ian V. Hogg, the M1938 howitzer "must, surely, be the most prolific piece of artillery in history".

Users
The M-30 and the Type 54 are still being used in several armies.

Current

  – n/a
  – n/a
  – 60
  – 57 Type 54/Type 54-1
  – 36 Type 54-1
  – Type 54
  – Type 54-1
  – less than 77
 
  – 324
  – less than 464
  – 9–18
  – 28
  – 100 Type 54
  – n/a
  – Peshmerga
 
  – 35
  – less than 20
  – 26
  – transferred from Russia to the Libyan National Army in 2017
  – 17
 
  – less than 24
  – 56
  – 490 Type 54
  – 72 (modernized M-30M variant)
  – 3,750, in reserve
  – 13 est.
  – Type 54/Type 54-1 
  – 24 M-30 and 76 Type 54
 
 
  – 80 Type 54-1
  – 18
  – 540
  – Type 54
  – 50
  – 24 Type 54

Former

 
 
  – 108 sold to Macedonia in 1999
 
  – 45 in 2002
  – Vz 38/74
 
 
  – Captured.
 
  – 230 Tarack 38/68M
 
 
  – 24, sold to Russia
  – 6 delivered from Romania
 
  – Wz.1938/1985, 280 in 2002
  – 46 in 2002
 
 
 
 
  – 240 delivered in 1962–1963

Variants

Former Soviet Union
 M-30S – Slightly modified variant; was used as the main armament of the SU-122 assault gun.
 U-11 – A gun with identical ballistics, but equipped with a more compact recoil mechanism for easier mounting in vehicles. It was tried on the experimental SU-122M and rejected due to insufficient reliability. A variant of the same gun was also mounted on the experimental Obiekt 234 tank, also known as Iosif Stalin no. 2 (not to be confused with the IS-2).
 D-6 – Another vehicle mounted gun with identical ballistics. It was used on the experimental SU-122-III and, like the U-11, proved unreliable.

People's Republic of China
 Type 54 – Licence version.
 Type 54-1 – Slightly improved version.

Poland
 Wz.1938/1985 – Existing Wz.1938 that was fitted with a castor wheel, PGO-9H sight and a second firing mechanism for direct fire.

Romania
 M-30M – In the 1980s Romanian Army M-30s were upgraded with new, larger pneumatic wheels, new brakes, a new optical sight for direct fire and a second height sighting mechanism for anti-tank combat. These upgraded howitzers were designated M-30M.

Self-propelled mounts

Former Soviet Union
The M-30 was mounted on the following armoured fighting vehicles (AFV):
 SU-122, the Soviet medium assault gun built on a T-34 chassis. The mass production continued from December 1942 until September 1943. In total 638 SU-122s were built.
 SG-122, Soviet self-propelled artillery vehicles based on captured German Pz Kpfw III or StuG III AFVs. About twenty were built in the early months of 1943.
 12,2-cm Kanone (r) auf Geschützwagen Lorraine-Shlepper (f), the German self-propelled artillery vehicle, based on a captured armoured French artillery tractor (the Lorraine 37L). There was at least one vehicle of this type, which fought in France on a railroad car as part of a German armoured train.

People's Republic of China
 Type WZ302 – Combination of the Type 54 or Type 54-1 with a tracked vehicle Type B531. The military designator is Type 70 SPH. The initial model had only 4 roadwheels, but the improved Type WZ302A or Type 70-1 has 5. The final production model with new signals equipment is known as Type WZ302B or Type 70-2. All models have a basic load of 40 rounds of 122 mm.

Romania
 Mareșal – World War II tank destroyer whose first four prototypes used the 122 mm M-30 howitzer with a muzzle brake attached to it. It was replaced with the Romanian 75 mm Reșița M1943 anti-tank gun for later prototypes and the serial production vehicles.

Summary
In the M-30, RKKA units finally received a modern divisional howitzer which successfully combined increased firepower and better mobility with reliability and ease of use. A summary of its employment by the Red Army was provided by Marshal G. F. Odintsov, who said "Nothing can be better". The long post-war employment of the howitzer is additional testimony to its combat and operational utility and effectiveness.

It is hard to compare the M-30 directly with contemporary foreign guns since the artillery of France, Germany and United States employed in similar roles was either the much smaller 105 mm (Great Britain used the even smaller—87.6 mm—25 pounder gun-howitzer) or much larger 150 to 155 mm caliber guns. Howitzers of similar calibers existed but most of those were World War I era pieces, such as the Vickers 114 mm howitzer used by the Finnish Army. Naturally, 150 mm howitzers were more powerful, but much heavier than the M-30; while 105 mm pieces were lighter but their smaller shells contained less explosive.

The most direct German equivalent was the 10.5 cm leFH 18 light howitzer. Weighing 1985 kg, it had a maximum elevation of 42°, muzzle velocity of 470 m/s and maximum range of 10,675 m. In the upgraded leFH 18/40 version, muzzle velocity was improved to 540 m/s, elevation to 45° and range to 12,325 m. About equal in range, the German howitzer had a less powerful HE shell and its smaller maximum elevation made it less effective against dug-in troops, although it also weighed some 400 kg less than M-30. Both guns were well suited for mass production with 16.887 M-30s and 15.388 leFH 18 built in 1941–45.

Ammunition data
The M-30 could fire all types of 122 mm howitzer ammunition used by the RKKA, including old Russian and imported shells. During and after World War II new types of ammunition were developed, notably HEAT shells. The World War II era HEAT shell BP-460A could pierce 100–160 mm of armor at 90°; the post-war BP-1 managed 200 mm at 90°, 160 mm at 60°, and 80 mm at 30°. HE-Frag projectiles of type OF-462 that were initially developed for the M-30 howitzer can be fired from modern 122 mm ordnance pieces and are still in Russian Army service.

Surviving pieces
M-30 howitzers are on display in a number of military museums and are widely used as memorial pieces. Among other places, the gun can be seen at the following locations:
 Central Armed Forces Museum and in the Museum of Great Patriotic War, Moscow.
 Museum of Artillery and Engineering Forces, Saint Petersburg.
 Museum of Heroic Defense and Liberation of Sevastopol on Sapun Mountain, Sevastopol
 Nizhny Novgorod, as a memorial piece at Marshal Zhukov's square.
 Artillery Museum in Hämeenlinna, Finland.
 IDF History Museum (Batey ha-Osef; Tel Aviv) and IDF Artillery Museum (Beyt ha-Totchan; Zichron Yaakov), Israel.
 Central Museum of The Royal Regiment of Canadian Artillery, Shilo Manitoba
 Zone 5 Military Museum, Danang
 In the National Military Museum, Romania, Bucharest.
 Captured piece at the War Museum, Huntington Park, Newport News, Virginia, United States (behind the museum, Mar 2021)
Another captured piece at the Texas Military Forces Museum, Camp Mabry, Austin, Texas, United States.

Notes

References

 Shirokorad A. B. – Encyclopedia of Russian Artillery, Mn. Harvest, 2000 (Широкорад А. Б.Энциклопедия отечественной артиллерии. — Мн.: Харвест, 2000. — 1156 с.: илл.)
 Shirokorad A. B.The God of War of The Third Reich, M. AST, 2002 (Широкорад А. Б.Бог войны Третьего рейха. — М.,ООО Издательство АСТ, 2002.)
 Shirokorad A. B.The genius of the Soviet Artillery, M. AST, 2002 (А.Б.Широкорад.Гений советской артиллерии.М.,ООО Издательство АСТ, 2002.)
 Ivanov A.Artillery of the USSR in Second World War, SPb Neva, 2003 (Иванов А. Артиллерия СССР во Второй Мировой войне. — СПб., Издательский дом Нева, 2003.)
 Shunkov V. N.The Weapons of the Red Army, Mn. Harvest, 1999 (Шунков В. Н.Оружие Красной Армии. — Мн.: Харвест, 1999.)
 Zheltov I. G., Pavlov I. V., Pavlov M. V., Solyankin A. G.Soviet Medium Self-propelled Artillery 1941–1945, M. Exprint, 2005 (Желтов И. Г., Павлов И. В., Павлов М. В., Солянкин А. Г.Советские средние самоходные артиллерийские установки 1941—1945 гг. — М.: ООО Издательский центр «Экспринт», 2005. — 48 с. )
 Third Axis Fourth Ally: Romanian Armed Forces in the European War, 1941–1945, 1 May 1995, p. 142, p. 224

External links
 M-30 walkaround at Dishmodels.ru

World War II field artillery
World War II artillery of the Soviet Union
122 mm artillery
Howitzers of the Soviet Union
Motovilikha Plants products
World War II howitzers
Military equipment introduced in the 1930s